Evgenii Solomonovich Golod  (21 October 1935 – 5 July 2018) was a Russian mathematician who proved the Golod–Shafarevich theorem on class field towers. As an application, he gave a negative solution to the Kurosh–Levitzky problem on the nilpotency of finitely generated nil algebras, and so to a weak form of Burnside's problem.

Golod was a student of Igor Shafarevich. As of 2015, Golod had 39 academic descendants, most of them through his student Luchezar L. Avramov.

Selected publications

References

1935 births
2018 deaths
Russian mathematicians
Scientists from Moscow